Najat Vallaud-Belkacem (Riffian-Berber: ⵏⴰⵊⴰⵜ ⴱⵍⵇⴰⵙⵎ; born 4 October 1977) is a former Moroccan-French jurist and politician of the Socialist Party (PS) who was the first French woman to serve as Minister of Education, Higher Education, and Research in the governments of successive Prime Ministers Manuel Valls and Bernard Cazeneuve from 2014 until 2017. Since 2020, she has been the director of the One Campaign in France.

Early life and education
Second in a family of seven children, Vallaud-Belkacem was born on 4 October 1977 in the Moroccan countryside in Bni Chiker, a village near Nador in the Rif region. Her grandmothers were respectively Spanish. She spent her early years growing up on her grandparents' farm. 

In 1982 Vallaud-Belkacem joined her father, a construction worker, with her mother and elder sister Fatiha. From then on, she grew up in a poor neighborhood of Abbeville, a town in northern France, and then in a suburb of Amiens. She got French nationality at 18. 

Vallaud-Belkacem graduated from the Institut d'études politiques de Paris (Sciences Po Paris) in 2002. At the Institut she met Boris Vallaud, whom she married on 27 August 2005.

Political career

Career in local politics
Vallaud-Belkacem joined the Socialist Party in 2002 and the team of Lyon mayor Gérard Collomb in 2003, leading actions to strengthen local democracy, the fight against discrimination, promotion of citizen rights, and access to employment and housing.

Elected to the Regional Council of Rhone-Alpes in 2004, she chaired the Culture Commission, resigning in 2008. In 2005, she became adviser to the Socialist Party. In 2005 and 2006 she was a columnist for the cultural programme C'est tout vu on Télé Lyon Municipale alongside Stéphane Cayrol.

Career in national politics
In February 2007 Vallaud-Belkacem joined Ségolène Royal's campaign team as a spokeswoman, alongside Vincent Peillon and Arnaud Montebourg.

In March 2008 Vallaud-Belkacem was elected conseillère générale of the Rhône department in the cantonal elections with 58.52% of the votes in the second round, under the banner of the Socialist Party in the canton of Lyon-XIII. From 2008 until 2014, she also served as a councillor of the city of Lyon, responsible for major events, youth and community life.

Vallaud-Belkacem served as Royal's spokesperson again in 2009 for the 2011 French Socialist Party presidential primary, this time alongside Delphine Batho. When François Hollande became the party's candidate to run for president in 2012, he appointed Vallaud-Belkacem his campaign spokeswoman.  

On 16 May 2012, Vallaud-Belkacem was appointed by President Hollande as Minister of Women's Rights and spokeswoman for the government in the Ayrault government and later in the First Valls Government. In the First Valls Government, she subsequently served as Minister of City Affairs (2 April 2012 to 25 August 2014) and Minister of Youth Affairs and Sports (2 April 2012 to 25 August 2014).

In her capacity as minister, Vallaud-Belkacem made headlines in 2012 when she introduced anti-sexism courses with presentations on stereotyping, inappropriate language, wage disparity and domestic violence for her fellow cabinet members. That same year, she announced that she wanted to abolish prostitution in France and in Europe; following her initiative, the National Assembly later voted in favour to give France some of the most restrictive legislation on prostitution in Europe. In 2013, she declared as officially revoked an old bylaw requiring women in Paris to ask permission from city authorities before "dressing as men", including wearing trousers (with exceptions for those "holding a bicycle handlebar or the reins of a horse"). 

In late 2014, shortly after her appointment as Minister of Education, Higher Education and Research, opinion polls ranked Vallaud-Belkacem only second in popularity among French politicians, after Alain Juppé. In early 2015, the New York Times described her as "one of the rising stars" within her party. By the end of Hollande's presidency, she was one of the few officials who had been a member of his various governments throughout his time in office.

After 15 years in public office, Vallaud-Belkacem decided to take a break from politics in June 2017. Despite speculation, she announced that she would not seek the leadership of the Socialist Party at the Aubervilliers Congress in 2018.

Career outside politics
In March 2018, Vallaud-Belkacem joined research and polling firm Ipsos as CEO of its Global Affairs division. The department carries out research (on impact, public policy evaluation…) that helps international institutions, NGOs, international foundations and other actors which act in the global public interest better make decisions. 

After two years at Ipsos, Vallaud-Belkacem announced in 2020 that she would be joining the One Campaign as director for France. In addition, she became the president of France terre d’asile in 2022. 

In addition, Vallaud-Belkacem launched and co-directs the Gender Equality and Public Policy programme at the Paris Institute of Political Studies. She also heads Raison de Plus, a collection of progressive essays published by Fayard.

In 2020, Vallaud-Belkacem was appointed as an affiliated professor at the Mohammed VI Polytechnic University in Ben Guerir, Morocco.

Other activities
 More in Common, Member of the Global Board 
 Tent Partnership for Refugees, Co-Chair of the Advisory Council

Political positions
Vallaud-Belkacem supports having the French government force Twitter to filter out hate speech that is illegal under French law, such as speech that is homophobic. Regarding same-sex marriage in France, she has stated that its legalisation is a matter of "historic progress".

In 2016, Vallaud-Belkacem was publicly criticized by Prime Minister Manuel Valls after she spoke out against the government's local decrees that ban women from wearing full-body swimsuits – so-called burkinis– on the beach, arguing the ban was "dangerous for national cohesion."

Personal attacks
In 2015, former president Nicolas Sarkozy was criticized for appealing to racist sentiments when he, without using explicitly racist words, singled out the two non-white female ministers – Vallaud-Belkacem and Christiane Taubira – in a largely white government for charges of gross incompetence.

Personal life
Vallaud-Belkacem describes herself as a "non-practicing Muslim".

Works

References

1977 births
Living people
21st-century French politicians
21st-century French women politicians
French city councillors
French Muslims
French Ministers of National Education
French people of Algerian descent
French people of Riffian descent
French people of Spanish descent
People from Bni Chiker
Government ministers of France
Government spokespersons of France
Moroccan emigrants to France
Moroccan people of Algerian descent
Moroccan people of Spanish descent
Politicians of the French Fifth Republic
Riffian people
Socialist Party (France) politicians
Sciences Po alumni
Women government ministers of France
French columnists
French women columnists
Moroccan columnists
Moroccan women columnists